Desruisseaux is a surname. Notable people with the surname include:

Paul Desruisseaux (1905–1982), Canadian lawyer, businessman, and politician
Pierre DesRuisseaux (1945–2016), Canadian poet

See also
Frédéric Advice-Desruisseaux (born 1983), French footballer

French-language surnames